Berryton is an unincorporated community in Chattooga County, in the U.S. state of Georgia.

History
Berryton was originally called "Raccoon" after a local textile mill of the same name. A post office called Berryton was established in 1910, and remained in operation until it was discontinued in 1956. The present name is after John Berry, proprietor of the mill.

References

Unincorporated communities in Chattooga County, Georgia
Unincorporated communities in Georgia (U.S. state)